2016 in men's road cycling is about the 2016 men's bicycle races governed by the UCI.

UCI World Ranking

In 2016, the UCI launched a new ranking system for men's road racing.

Year-end ranking

World Championships

The World Road Championships is set to be held in Doha, Qatar, from 9 to 16 October 2016.

Olympic Games

Grand Tours

UCI tours

UCI World Tour

2.HC Category

1.HC Category Races

Championships

Continental Championships

National Championships

UCI Teams

UCI WorldTeams

UCI Professional Continental and Continental teams

References

 

Men's road cycling by year
2016 in sports